This is a list of Australian Aboriginal prehistoric sites.

Key:
 BGS = Below ground surface
 C14 = Radiocarbon date
 char. = charcoal
 OSL = Optical stimulated thermoluminescence
 AA = Australian Archaeology

References

Josephine Flood (2004) Archaeology of the Dreamtime, J.B Publishing, Marleston 

Archaeological sites in Australia